Kalukembe (also known as Caluquembe, Caluguembe, or Caluqueme) was one of the traditional independent Ovimbundu kingdoms in Angola.

References

Ovimbundu kingdoms